Poolside is the third album by the American pop–Latin freestyle–electronic dance music group Nu Shooz. It was released on Atlantic Records in the U.S. in May 1986. At the time, the band was creating music in both the synthpop and freestyle genres. It was the band's first major-label release (an earlier album, Can't Turn It Off, was released by the Nebula Circle label in 1982 and a not-heavily promoted EP, Tha's Right was released in 1985), and it was responsible for its breakthrough on the pop and dance charts in both the United States and the United Kingdom. The album was certified gold by the RIAA later in the year for sales of over 500,000 units. It peaked on the Billboard 200 at No. 27 and spawned three singles that charted in the U.S.: "I Can't Wait," "Point of No Return," and "Don't Let Me Be the One." In the UK, the album reached No. 32 on the UK Albums Chart.

Track listing 
All Songs Published By Poolside Music.
 "Lost Your Number" (John Smith) - 5:43
 "I Can't Wait" (Smith) - 5:25
 "Don't Let Me Be the One" (Smith) - 4:23
 "Goin' thru the Motions" (Smith, Valerie Day) - 4:01
 "You Put Me in a Trance" (Smith, Caton Lyles) - 4:20
 "Point of No Return" (Smith, Day) - 4:23
 "Secret Message" (Smith, Jeff Lorber, Lewis Livermore) - 3:30
 "Don't You Be Afraid" (Smith) - 5:14

Charts

Personnel

Nu Shooz 
 Valerie Day – vocals, percussion 
 John Smith – keyboards, guitars, vocals

Additional musicians 
 Jeff Lorber – keyboards 
 Ron Regan – keyboards, saxophone
 Steve Reid – keyboards
 Gary Fountaine – bass 
 Nathaniel Phillips – bass
 Marty Higgins – drums
 Danny Schauffler – saxophone (2)
 Lewis Livermore – trumpet
 Shannon Day – backing vocals 
 Lori Lamphear – backing vocals (2)

Production 
 John Smith – producer, arrangements 
 Rick Waritz – producer, arrangements, management 
 Jeff Lorber – associate producer, additional rhythm arrangements
 Marion McClain – associate producer
 Shep Pettibone – associate producer, mixing (1, 3, 6)
 Tchad Blake – engineer 
 Ellen Fitton – engineer 
 Mike Moore – engineer, mix down engineer 
 Fritz Richmond – engineer 
 Jim Rodgers – engineer 
 Stephen Shelton – engineer 
 Bobby Warner – engineer 
 Joe Arlotta – mix down engineer
 Jay Mark – mix down engineer
 Andy Wallace – mix down engineer
 Peter Slaghuis – mixing (2)
 Freddy Batsone – mixing (4, 7)
 Timmy Regisford – mixing (5, 8)
 Dennis King – LP mastering 
 Barry Diament – CD mastering 
 Bob Defrin – art direction, design 
 Javier Romero – cover illustration

Studios
 Recorded at The Sound Factory (Hollywood, California); JHL Sound (Pacific Palisades, California); Cascade Recording Studios and Spectrum Studios (Portland, Oregon); Atlantic Studios (New York City, New York).
 Mastered at Atlantic Studios.

Singles

References

Nu Shooz albums
1986 albums
Atlantic Records albums
Synth-pop albums by American artists